Mood Music is a play by Joe Penhall

Production history 
The play premiered at The Old Vic, London from 21 April to 16 June 2018 in a production directed by Roger Michell and starring Ben Chaplin as Bernard (who had assumed the role following the departure of Rhys Ifans) and Seána Kerslake as Cat.

In July 2020, during the COVID-19 pandemic, an archive recording of the Old Vic production was streamed on YouTube for one week as part of the Your Old Vic project.

Cast and characters

Reception 
The production opened at the Old Vic to positive reviews, with five stars from the Evening Standard and four stars from The Times, The Guardian, The Independent and The Arts Desk.

References 

2018 plays
English plays